Kierieian is a small village in the town of Hopkinton in the U.S. state of Rhode Island.

Overview
Kierieian is located directly to the east of the village of Ashaway, Rhode Island and to the west of the village of South Hopkinton, Rhode Island. The village is located around Rhode Island Route 216 at Ashaway Road. Residents of Kierieian use Ashaway's zip code, 02804.

References

Villages in Washington County, Rhode Island
Villages in Rhode Island